White Post Historic District is a national historic district located at White Post, Clarke County, Virginia. It encompasses 23 contributing buildings and 1 contributing object in the crossroads village of White Post. The contributing object is the white-painted marker which Thomas, Sixth Lord Fairfax, had erected in the 1760s (supposedly erected by then-Col. George Washington) to point the way to Greenway Court, his nearby estate. 

The most distinguished building is the Bishop Meade Memorial Church (1875), named for White Post's Bishop William Meade, who grew up at the nearby Lucky Hit plantation. Also located in the district and separately listed is Meadea, the only remaining 18th century building. The historic district also includes 20 other residences, 3 commercial structures, as well as the Methodist church and parish hall, and an abandoned post office.

It was listed on the National Register of Historic Places in 1983.

References

External links
 

Historic districts in Clarke County, Virginia
National Register of Historic Places in Clarke County, Virginia
Historic districts on the National Register of Historic Places in Virginia